Ozawa (written:  or  lit. "small swamp") is a Japanese surname. Notable people with the surname include:

Eitaro Ozawa (1909-1988), Japanese actor
Ichirō Ozawa (born 1942), Japanese politician
Hideaki Ozawa (born 1974), Japanese football goalkeeper
, Japanese speed skater
Jisaburō Ozawa (1886-1966), Japanese admiral and last Commander-in-Chief of the Combined Fleet during World War II
Juri Osada (née Ozawa), Japanese figure skater and coach
, Japanese film director
Kenji Ozawa (born 1968), Japanese musician, nephew of Seiji Ozawa
Maria Ozawa (born 1986), Japanese adult video (AV) actress
, Japanese composer, music arranger and guitarist
Michihiro Ozawa (born 1932), Japanese former football player
Natsuki Ozawa (born 1972), Japanese singer, actress and adult video (AV) performer
Narutaka Ozawa (born 1974), Japanese mathematician 
Ryota Ozawa (born 1988), Japanese actor
, Japanese speed skater
Sakihito Ozawa (born 1954), Japanese politician
Seiji Ozawa (born 1935), Japanese conductor
Tsukasa Ozawa (born 1988), Japanese football player
Yuki Ozawa (born 1983), Japanese football player
, Japanese actor

See also
Ozawa v. United States, a 1922 case in which the United States Supreme Court found Takao Ozawa, a Japanese-American, ineligible for naturalization
Osawari Tantei: Ozawa Rina, a Nintendo DS game known as Touch Detective in the United States and Mystery Detective in Europe
Ōsawa

Japanese-language surnames